Artyom Valinteyev (born 15 October 1983) is a Russian freestyle skier. He competed in the men's moguls event at the 2006 Winter Olympics.

References

1983 births
Living people
Russian male freestyle skiers
Olympic freestyle skiers of Russia
Freestyle skiers at the 2006 Winter Olympics
Sportspeople from Tomsk